Jim's Super Stereoworld is the debut solo album by former Carter USM singer/guitarist Jim Bob. It was released in 2000 on Music Blitz Records.

Track listing
 Bonkers in the Nut
 Greetings Earthlings (We Come in Peace)
 Pear Shaped World
 Superslob
 The Happiest Man Alive
 Could U B The 1 I Waited 4
 1000 Feet Above The Earth
 A Bad Day
 The King Is Dead
 My Name Is John (And I Want You Back)
 When You're Gone (parts 1 & 2)
 Touchy Feely

References

Jim Bob albums
2000 debut albums